Uruguayan Antarctica is the sector of Antarctica where Professor Julio César Musso believes the Oriental Republic of Uruguay should exercise its sovereignty. It was not assigned a specific definition nor meant a territorial claim, but rather was intended as an area of natural action of the southern maritime projection of Uruguay. Uruguay is part of the Antarctic Treaty System as a consulting member, and it reserved the right to make a territorial claim.

Uruguayan Antarctica Day

Bill of 1985 
On May 8, 1985, then-Senator Luis Alberto Lacalle introduced a new bill in order to point a day in the year as the "Uruguayan Antarctica Day" (Día de la Antártida Uruguaya) and promote the study and dissemination of the issue among the younger generations. In the preamble, Lacalle argued that "we have chosen the 28th of August, as the foundation of the Uruguayan Antarctic Institute, inspired by the teachings of Professor Julio C. Musso, has been the area where the Antarctic vocation of our country was born and raised."

See also 

 Uruguayan Antarctic Institute
 Brazilian Antarctica

References

External links 
Instituto Antártico Uruguayo
Asociación Antarkos
Apuntes de historia del Uruguay en la Antártida
Proyección a la Antártida "Programa radial"
Día de Uruguay en la Antártida

 
Territorial claims in Antarctica